The World Association of Ugly People (in Italian Club dei Brutti) is an organization dedicated to fighting for the recognition of ugly people, in a society that places a high value on physical beauty. The group's motto is "A person is what he is and not what he looks like".

History 
The club claims to have a history in Piobbico, Italy, from 1879. It was launched again in 1963 as a marriage agency for the town's single women.

The World Association of Ugly People club campaigns against discrimination in the workplace based on looks. It attempts to make society more aware of ugly people's problems. It also helps people overcome their phobias and, in some cases, to find partners.

In 2007, the group unveiled a monument dedicated to ugly people in Piobbico's town square. The monument depicts an unknown person looking at his reflection in a mirror.

Traditions 
The club's emblem is the head of a wild boar. The club's crest features a reclining man smoking a pipe with the slogan: "Ugliness is a virtue, beauty is slavery".

The club's patron is Vulcan from Roman mythology. At birth Vulcan was so ugly that his mother threw him over a cliff. He survived and became a skilled blacksmith. For providing Achilles with superior weapons, he was admitted to Mount Olympus where he married the beautiful Venus, goddess of love.

President 
The members of the World Association of Ugly People elect their president annually during the Festival of the Ugly. This event is hosted by the small town of Piobbico in the Marche region of Italy every year on the first Sunday of September.

Every year until 2007, Telesforo Iacobelli won the top prize and was president of the club, owing to his dedication to the organization. Also, he has a small nose in a culture where large noses are considered beautiful. On August 21, 2006, Iacobelli died.

Members 
The following people have been members of the association.

 Hausi Ionut Ioan
 Mike Bongiorno
 Paolo Bonolis
 Pippo Franco
 Piero Badaloni
 Alessandro Cecchi Paone
 Gerry Scotti
 Maria Amelia Monti
 Robert Alai

In popular culture 
In 2010, the Association provided inspiration for the song "Club Dei Brutti" by the English band Idiot Savant.

References

External links 
 Picture of the door to the Club dei Brutti

Disability organisations based in Italy
Prejudices
Organizations established in 1963
1963 establishments in Italy
Ugliness